Get Rocked! is the second studio album by Australian pop group Hush. The album was aired in June 1974 peaked at No. 9 and was certified triple gold on the Australian charts.

Track listing

Charts

References 

1974 albums
Hush (band) albums